Gwladys Perrie Williams (Lady Hopkin Morris) (1889–1958) was a Welsh educationalist and writer. She served as member of the committee which produced The Newbolt Report (1921) on The Teaching of English. Her spouse, who she supported while he was reading for the bar at King's College, London was the Welsh Liberal MP Rhys Hopkin Morris

Selected works
 Williams, Gwladys Perrie. 1915. Li biaus Descouneüs de Renaud de Beaujeu: texte publié avec Introduction et commentaire.
 Williams, Gwladys Perrie. 1918. Welsh education in sunlight and shadow. London: Constable and Company.
 Williams, Gwladys Perrie. 1933. Northox Group Intelligence Test. For ages 11–12 years. [With "Instructions" and a key.]. 2 Ser. G.G. Harrap & Co: London.

References

1889 births
1958 deaths
Welsh educational theorists